Cory Elenio (born August 14, 1986) is an American soccer player.

Career

College and Amateur 
Elenio was born in Ann Arbor, Michigan. He attended the University of Evansville and tallied 18 goals and 19 assists in four years, becoming the 18th leading scorer in school history. Elenio was named to the NSCAA All-Midwest Region team and the All-Missouri Valley Conference first team in both 2006 and 2007. In 2005, Elenio also played for Fort Wayne Fever in the Premier Development League.

Professional 
Elenio was Columbus Crew's second-round selection (20th overall) in the 2008 MLS Supplemental Draft. He trained with Columbus during the preseason and appeared in the club's MLS Reserve Division matches at D.C. United and Toronto FC before playing his first minutes as a professional on June 14, 2008, against Kansas City Wizards. He was cut by Columbus on March 23, 2010. Shortly thereafter Elenio signed with Carolina RailHawks.

References

External links 
 

1986 births
Living people
American soccer players
Evansville Purple Aces men's soccer players
Fort Wayne Fever players
Columbus Crew players
North Carolina FC players
Major League Soccer players
North American Soccer League players
Sportspeople from Ann Arbor, Michigan
Soccer players from Michigan
Syracuse Silver Knights players
Wilmington Hammerheads FC players
USL League Two players
USSF Division 2 Professional League players
USL Championship players
Columbus Crew draft picks
Association football midfielders
Major Indoor Soccer League (2008–2014) players
Major Arena Soccer League players